Wavertree Road Ground was a cricket ground in Liverpool, Lancashire.  The first recorded match on the ground was in 1847, when Liverpool played Birkenhead Park.

In 1859, the ground held its first first-class match when the Gentlemen of the North played the Gentlemen of the South.  The next first-class match held on the ground came in 1863 when the North played the South.  Lancashire played a single first-class match there in 1866 against Surrey.  The final first-class match there came in 1872 when the North played the South.

The final recorded match held on the ground came in 1880 when Wavertree played the Gentlemen of Canada.  Shortly after this match the ground was sold for development and built over.

References

External links
Wavertree Road Ground on CricketArchive
Wavertree Road Ground on Cricinfo

Defunct cricket grounds in England
Cricket grounds in Merseyside
Defunct sports venues in Liverpool
Sports venues completed in 1847
1847 establishments in England